Fuel injection is the introduction of fuel in an internal combustion engine, most commonly automotive engines, by the means of an injector. This article focuses on fuel injection in reciprocating piston and Wankel rotary engines.

All compression-ignition engines (e.g. diesel engines), and many spark-ignition engines (i.e. petrol (gasoline) engines, such as Otto or Wankel), use fuel injection of one kind or another. Mass-produced diesel engines for passenger cars (such as the Mercedes-Benz OM 138) became available in the late 1930s and early 1940s, being the first fuel-injected engines for passenger car use. In passenger car petrol engines, fuel injection was introduced in the early 1950s and gradually gained prevalence until it had largely replaced carburettors by the early 1990s. The primary difference between carburetion and fuel injection is that fuel injection atomizes the fuel through a small nozzle under high pressure, while a carburettor relies on suction created by intake air accelerated through a Venturi tube to draw fuel into the airstream.

The term "fuel injection" is vague and comprises various distinct systems with fundamentally different functional principles. Typically, the only thing all fuel injection systems have in common is a lack of carburetion. There are two main functional principles of mixture formation systems for internal combustion engines: internal mixture formation, and external mixture formation. A fuel injection system that uses external mixture formation is called a manifold injection system. There exist two types of manifold injection systems: multi-point injection (or port injection) and single-point injection (or throttle body injection). Internal mixture formation systems can be separated into direct and indirect injection systems. There exist several different varieties of both direct and indirect injection systems; the most common internal mixture formation fuel injection system is the common-rail injection system, a direct injection system. The term "electronic fuel injection" refers to any fuel injection system controlled by an engine control unit.

System functions 

The fundamental functions of a fuel injection system are described in the following sections. In some systems, a single component performs multiple functions.

Pressurising fuel 
Fuel injection operated by spraying pressurised fuel into the engine. Therefore a device to pressurize the fuel (such as a fuel pump) is needed.

Metering of fuel 
The system must determine the appropriate amount of fuel to be supplied and control the fuel flow to supply this amount.

Several early mechanical injection systems used relatively sophisticated helix-controlled injection pump(s) that both metered fuel and created injection pressure. Since the 1980s, electronic systems have been used to control the metering of fuel. More recent systems use an electronic engine control unit which meters the fuel, controls the ignition timing and controls various other engine functions.

Injecting of fuel 
The fuel injector is effectively a spray nozzle that performs the final stage in the delivery of fuel into the engine. The injector is located in the combustion chamber, inlet manifold or - less commonly - the throttle body.

Fuel injectors which also control the metering are called "injection valves", while injectors which perform all three functions are called unit injectors.

Direct injection systems 
Direct injection means that the fuel is injected into the main combustion chamber of each cylinder. The air and fuel are mixed only inside the combustion chamber. Therefore, only air is sucked into the engine during the intake stroke. The injection scheme is always intermittent (either sequential or cylinder-individual).

This can be done either with a blast of air or hydraulically, with the latter method being more common in automotive engines. Typically, hydraulic direct injection systems spray fuel into the air inside the cylinder or combustion chamber. Direct injection can be achieved with a conventional helix-controlled injection pump, unit injectors, or a sophisticated common-rail injection system. The latter is the most common system in modern automotive engines.

Direct injection for petrol engines 

During the 20th century, most petrol engines used either a carburettor or indirect fuel injection. Use of direct injection in petrol engines has become increasingly common in the 21st century.

Common-rail injection systems 

In a common rail system, fuel from the fuel tank is supplied to a common header (called the accumulator), and then sent through tubing to the injectors, which inject it into the combustion chamber. The accumulator has a high-pressure relief valve to maintain pressure and return the excess fuel to the fuel tank. The fuel is sprayed with the help of a nozzle that is opened and closed with a solenoid-operated needle valve.

The types of common-rail systems include air-guided injection and spray-guided injection.

Unit injector systems 

Used by diesel engines, these systems include:
 Pumpe-Düse
 Pump-rail-nozzle system

Helix-controlled pump systems 
This injection method was previously used in many diesel engines. Types of systems include:
 Lanova direct injection
 Afterchamber injection
 G-System (sphere combustion chamber)
 Gardner system (hemisphere combustion chamber)
 Saurer system (torus combustion chamber)
 Flat piston (combustion chamber between piston and head)

Air-blast injection systems

Other systems 
The M-System, used in some diesel engines from the 1960s to the 1980s, sprayed the fuel onto the walls of the combustion chamber, as opposed to most other direct-injection systems which spray the fuel into the middle of the chamber.

Indirect injection systems

Manifold injection 

Manifold injection systems are common in petrol-fuelled engines such as the Otto engine and the Wankel engine. In a manifold injection system, air and fuel are mixed outside the combustion chamber so that a mixture of air and fuel is sucked into the engine. The main types of manifold injections systems are multi-point injection and single-point injection. 

These systems use either a continuous injection or an intermittent injection design. In a continuous injection system, fuel flows at all times from the fuel injectors, but at a variable flow rate. The most common automotive continuous injection system is the Bosch K-Jetronic system, introduced in 1974 and used until the mid-1990s by various car manufacturers. Intermittent injection systems can be sequential, in which injection is timed to coincide with each cylinder's intake stroke; batched, in which fuel is injected to the cylinders in groups, without precise synchronization to any particular cylinder's intake stroke; simultaneous, in which fuel is injected at the same time to all the cylinders; or cylinder-individual, in which the engine control unit can adjust the injection for each cylinder individually.

Multi-point injection 

Multi-point injection (also called 'port injection') injects fuel into the intake ports just upstream of each cylinder's intake valve, rather than at a central point within an intake manifold. Typically, multi-point injected systems use multiple fuel injectors, but some systems, such as GM's central port injection system, use tubes with poppet valves fed by a central injector instead of multiple injectors.

Single-point injection 

Single-point injection (also called 'throttle-body injection') uses one injector in a throttle body mounted similarly to a carburettor on an intake manifold. As in a carburetted induction system, the fuel is mixed with the air before entering the intake manifold. Single-point injection was a relatively low-cost way for automakers to reduce exhaust emissions to comply with tightening regulations while providing better "driveability" (easy starting, smooth running, no engine stuttering) than could be obtained with a carburettor. Many of the carburettor's supporting components—such as the air filter, intake manifold, and fuel line routing—could be used with few or no changes. This postponed the redesign and tooling costs of these components. Single-point injection was used extensively on American-made passenger cars and light trucks during 1980–1995, and in some European cars in the early and mid-1990s.

Diesel engines 
In indirect-injected engines used by diesel engines (as well as Akroyd engines), there are two combustion chambers: the main combustion chamber, and a pre-chamber (also called an ante-chamber) that is connected to the main one. The fuel is injected only into the pre-chamber (where it begins to combust), and not directly into the main combustion chamber. Therefore, this principle is called indirect injection. There exist several slightly different indirect injection systems that have similar characteristics.

Types of indirect injection used by diesel engines include:
Precombustion-chamber injection
Air-cell chamber injection

Hot-bulb injection

History

1870s – 1930s: early systems 

In 1872, George Bailey Brayton obtained a patent on an internal combustion engine that used a pneumatic fuel injection system, also invented by Brayton: air-blast injection. In 1894, Rudolf Diesel copied Brayton's air-blast injection system for the diesel engine, but also improved it. In the meantime, the first manifold injection system was designed by Johannes Spiel in 1884, while working at Hallesche Maschinenfabrik in Germany. 

In 1891, the British Herbert-Akroyd oil engine became the first engine to use a pressurised fuel injection system. This design, called a hot-bulb engine used a 'jerk pump' to dispense fuel oil at high pressure to an injector. Another development in early diesel engines was the pre-combustion chamber, which was invented in 1919 by Prosper l'Orange to avoid the drawbacks of air-blast injection systems. The pre-combustion chamber made it feasible to produce engines in size suitable for automobiles and MAN Truck & Bus presented the first direct-injected diesel engine for trucks in 1924. Higher pressure diesel injection pumps were introduced by Bosch in 1927.

In 1898, German company Deutz AG started producing four-stroke petrol stationary engines with manifold injection. The 1906 Antoinette 8V aircraft engine (the world's first V8 engine) was another early four-stroke engine that used manifold injection. The first petrol engine with direct-injection was a two-stroke aircraft engine designed by Otto Mader in 1916. Another early spark-ignition engine to use direct-injection was the 1925 Hesselman engine, designed by Swedish engineer Jonas Hesselman. This engine could run on a variety of fuels (such as oil, kerosene, petrol or diesel oil) and used a stratified charge principle whereby fuel is injected towards the end of the compression stroke, then ignited with a spark plug.

The Cummins Model H diesel truck engine was introduced in America in 1933. In 1936, the Mercedes-Benz OM 138 diesel engine (using a precombustion chamber) became one of the first fuel-injected engines used in a mass-production passenger car.

1940s – 1950s: WWII aircraft and early direct-injection petrol engines 
During World War II, several petrol engines for aircraft used direct-injection systems, such as the European Junkers Jumo 210, Daimler-Benz DB 601, BMW 801, and the Shvetsov ASh-82FN (M-82FN). The German direct-injection systems were based on diesel injection systems used by Bosch, Deckel, Junkers and l'Orange. By around 1943, the Rolls-Royce Merlin and Wright R-3350 had switched from traditional carburettors to fuel-injection (called "pressure carburettors" at the time), however these engines used throttle body manifold injection, rather than the direct-injection systems of the German engines. From 1940, the Mitsubishi Kinsei 60 series engine used a direct-injection system, along with the related Mitsubishi Kasei engine from 1941. In 1943, a low-pressure fuel injection system was added to the Nakajima Homare Model 23 radial engine.

The first mass-produced petrol direct-injection system was developed by Bosch and initially used in small automotive two-stroke petrol engines. Introduced in the 1950 Goliath GP700 small saloon, it was also added to the Gutbrod Superior engine in 1952. This mechanically-controlled system was essentially a specially lubricated high-pressure diesel direct-injection pump of the type that is governed by the vacuum behind an intake throttle valve. A Bosch mechanical direct-injection system was also used in the straight-eight used in the 1954 Mercedes-Benz W196 Formula One racing car. The first four-stroke direct-injection petrol engine for a passenger car was released the following year, in the Mercedes-Benz 300SL sports car. However the engine suffered lubrication problems due to petrol diluting the engine oil, and subsequent Mercedes-Benz engines switched to a manifold injection design. Likewise, most petrol injection systems prior to the 2000s used the less-expensive manifold injection design.

1950s – 1970s: manifold injection for petrol engines 

Throughout the 1950s, several manufacturers introduced their manifold injection systems for petrol engines. Lucas Industries had begun developing a fuel injection system in 1941 and by 1956 it was used in the Jaguar racing cars. At the 1957 24 Hours of Le Mans, the 1st to 4th placed cars were Jaguar D-Type entries using a Lucas fuel injection system. Also in 1957, General Motors introduced the Rochester Ramjet option, consisting of a fuel injection system for the V8 engine in the Chevrolet Corvette. During the 1960s, fuel injection systems were also produced by Hilborn, SPICA and Kugelfischer.

Up until this time, the fuel injection systems had used a mechanical control system. In 1957, the American Bendix Electrojector system was introduced, which used analogue electronics for the control system. The Electrojector was intended to be available for the Rambler Rebel mid-size car, however reliability problems meant that the fuel injection option was not offered. In 1958, the Chrysler 300D, DeSoto Adventurer, Dodge D-500 and Plymouth Fury offered the Electrojector system, becoming the first cars known to use an electronic fuel injection (EFI) system.

The Electrojector patents were subsequently sold to Bosch, who developed the Electrojector into the Bosch D-Jetronic. The D-Jetronic was produced from 1967-1976 and first used on the VW 1600TL/E. The system was a speed/density system, using engine speed and intake manifold air density to calculate the amount of fuel to be injected. In 1974, Bosch introduced the K-Jetronic system, which used a continuous flow of fuel from the injectors (rather than the pulsed flow of the D-Jetronic system). K-Jetronic was a mechanical injection system, using a plunger actuated by the intake manifold pressure which then controlled the fuel flow to the injectors. 

Also in 1974, Bosch introduced the L-Jetronic system, a pulsed flow system which used an air flow meter to calculate the amount of fuel required. L-Jetronic was widely adopted on European cars during the 1970s and 1980s. As a system that uses electronically-controlled fuel injectors which open and close to control the amount of fuel entering the engine, the L-Jetronic system uses the same basic principles as modern electronic fuel injection (EFI) systems.

1980s – present: digital electronics and common-rail injection
Prior to 1979, the electronics in fuel injection systems used analogue electronics for the control system. The Bosch Motronic multi-point fuel injection system (also amongst the first systems where the ignition system is controlled by the same device as the fuel injection system) was the first mass-produced system to use digital electronics. The Ford EEC-III single-point fuel injection system, introduced in 1980, was another early digital fuel injection system. These and other electronic manifold injection systems (using either port injection or throttle-body injection) became more widespread through the 1980s, and by the early 1990s they had replaced carburettors in most new petrol-engined cars sold in developed countries.

The aforementioned injection systems for petrol passenger car engines - except for the 1954-1959 Mercedes-Benz 300 SL - all used manifold injection (i.e. the injectors located at the intake ports or throttle body, instead of inside the combustion chamber). This began to change when the first mass-produced petrol direct injection system for passenger cars was a common rail system introduced in the 1997 Mitsubishi 6G74 V6 engine.  The first common-rail system for a passenger car diesel engine was the Fiat Multijet straight-four engine, introduced in the 1999 Alfa Romeo 156 1.9 JTD model. Since the 2010s, many petrol engines have switched to direct-injection (sometimes in combination with separate manifold injectors for each cylinder). Similarly, many modern diesel engines use a common-rail design.

Stratified charge injection was used in several petrol engines in the early 2000s, such as the Volkswagen 1.4 FSI engine introduced in 2000. However, the stratified charge systems were largely no longer in use by the late 2010s, due to increased exhaust emissions of NOx gasses and particulates, along with the increased cost and complexity of the systems.

References

See also 

 Carburettor
 Common rail
 Diesel engine#Fuel injection
 Petrol direct injection
 Indirect injection
 Unit injector for diesel engines

Engine components
Fuel injection systems